Robert Gerald Goldsborough (born October 3, 1937 in Chicago, Illinois) is an American journalist and writer of mystery novels. He worked for 45 years for the Chicago Tribune and Advertising Age, but gained prominence as the author of a series of 16 authorized pastiches of Rex Stout's Nero Wolfe detective stories, published from 1986 to 1994 and from 2012 to 2021. The first novel, Murder in E Minor (1986), received a Nero Award.

In 2005, Goldsborough published Three Strikes You're Dead, the first novel of a five book series of period mysteries featuring Chicago Tribune reporter Steve (Snap) Malek.

Biography
Robert Goldsborough was born October 3, 1937, in Chicago, the son of architect Robert Vincent Goldsborough and Wilma (Janak) Goldsborough. He grew up in Elmhurst, Illinois, and graduated from York Community High School before attending Northwestern University, where he earned a bachelor's and a master's degree (1959, 1960) from the Medill School of Journalism.

Journalism

After a year of reporting for the Associated Press, Goldsborough went to work for the Chicago Tribune as a reporter (1960–1963). From 1963 to 1966, he served as assistant editor of the newspaper's Sunday magazine and TV Week, which he edited from 1966 to 1967. He was assistant to the features editor (1967–1971) and editor (1971–1972), and was named Sunday editor (1972–1975) and editor of the Sunday magazine (1975–1982). In 1982, he joined Advertising Age as editor and became the magazine's special projects director in 1988. He retired in December 2004.

Nero Wolfe

Goldsborough gained national renown in the 1980s with the publication — approved by the estate of Rex Stout — of his Nero Wolfe mystery Murder in E Minor (1986). Written privately for his mother back in 1978, shortly after the death of Stout (creator of the Nero Wolfe mysteries), Goldsborough's novel received a Nero Award. Fourteen other Nero Wolfe books by Goldsborough followed, including (2020).

"As the one who extended the life of Rex’s Stout’s famed private eye Nero Wolfe with seven novels in the 1980s and ’90s, I got both praise and derision — praise from readers who were glad to have more tales of Wolfe and his loyal right-hand, Archie Goodwin, and derision from those who either lamented that 'you haven’t got it right' or who felt fictional characters should be allowed to die with their creators," Goldsborough wrote in 2011.

Goldsborough resumed his Nero Wolfe series with Archie Meets Nero Wolfe (2012), a prequel to Stout's novels, followed by Murder in the Ball Park (2014).

Snap Malek

In 2005, Goldsborough turned his attention to creating books with his own characters, beginning with Three Strikes You're Dead, a mystery set in pre-war Chicago, featuring Steve (Snap) Malek, a reporter for the Chicago Tribune.  In February 2006, Three Strikes You're Dead was named Best Historical Mystery at the eighth annual Love is Murder awards banquet. Terror at the Fair (2011), the fifth book in the Snap Malek series, received the Lovey Award in 2012.

Bibliography

Nero Wolfe novels

Snap Malek novels

Non-fiction

Awards
1986: Murder in E Minor, the first of Robert Goldsborough's continuations of Rex Stout's Nero Wolfe series, received a Nero Award from The Wolfe Pack.
2006: Three Strikes You're Dead, the first book in the Snap Malek mystery series, received the Love is Murder Readers Choice Award for Best Historical Mystery.
2012: Terror at the Fair, the fifth book in the Snap Malek series, received the Lovey Award for Best Historical Novel at the 2012 Love is Murder Mystery Conference.

References

External links

20th-century American novelists
21st-century American novelists
American male novelists
American mystery writers
Nero Wolfe
1937 births
Living people
Writers from Chicago
Chicago Tribune people
Nero Award winners
Medill School of Journalism alumni
Novelists from Illinois
20th-century American male writers
21st-century American male writers